Shyam Satardekar (born 3 March 1966 in Curchorem, Goa) is an Indian politician and member of the Goa Suraksha Manch. Satardekar was a member of the Goa Legislative Assembly from the Curchorem constituency in South Goa.

References 

1966 births
Living people
People from South Goa district
Goa MLAs 2007–2012
21st-century Indian politicians
Indian National Congress politicians from Goa
Goa Suraksha Manch politicians